The 1925 Ottawa Senators finished in 1st place in the Interprovincial Rugby Football Union with a 4–1–1 record and won the first Grey Cup in franchise history by defeating the Winnipeg Tammany Tigers 24–1 at Lansdowne Park.

Regular season

Standings

Schedule

Postseason

References

Ottawa Rough Riders seasons
James S. Dixon Trophy championship seasons
Grey Cup championship seasons